Striarca is a genus of bivalves belonging to the family Noetiidae.

The genus has cosmopolitan distribution.

Species:

 †Striarca africana 
 †  Striarca angulata (Scott 1970) 
Striarca centenaria 
 † Striarca compressa  Martin, 1883
 † Striarca cossmanni  Laubriere, 1887
 † Striarca decipiens  (G.P. Deshayes, 1858)
 † Striarca dispar  (G.P. Deshayes, 1858) 
Striarca erythraea 
 Striarca gaymardi  (B.C.M. Payraudeau, 1826)
 Striarca lactea 
 † Striarca lamyi  E.J. Koperberg, 1931
 † Striarca margaritula  (G.P. Deshayes, 1858) 
 Striarca miocaenica  A.E.M. Cossmann & M.A. Peyrot, 1912
Striarca navicella 
Striarca pisolina 
 † Striarca pretiosa (G.P. Deshayes, 1858)
 † Striarca saffordi (W.M. Gabb, 1860) (FOSSIL)
Striarca symmetrica 
 † Striarca umbonata 
Striarca zebuensis 
Synonyms
 Striarca afra (Gmelin, 1791): synonym of Arcopsis afra (Gmelin, 1791)
 Striarca crinita R. Pulteney, 1799: synonym of Striarca lactea  (C. Linnaeus, 1758)
 Striarca fausta Habe, 1951: synonym of Verilarca fausta (Habe, 1951)
 Striarca gaimardi B.C.M. Payraudeau, 1826: synonym of Striarca lactea  (C. Linnaeus, 1758)
 Striarca gibba (Krauss, 1848): synonym of Striarca pisolina (Lamarck, 1819)
 Striarca interplicata (Grabau & S. G. King, 1928): synonym of Verilarca interplicata (Grabau & S. G. King, 1928)
 Striarca koshibensis K.M. Hatai & Nishiyama, 1952: synonym of Didimacar tenebrica (L.A. Reeve, 1844)
 Striarca lactanea S.V. Wood, 1840: synonym of Striarca lactea  (C. Linnaeus, 1758)
 Striarca margarethae J.C. Melvill & R. Standen, 1907: synonym of Arcopsis sculptilis  (L.A. Reeve, 1844)
 Striarca miocenica A.E.M. Cossmann & M.A. Peyrot, 1912: synonym of Striarca miocaenica  A.E.M. Cossmann & M.A. Peyrot, 1912
 Striarca modiolus G.S. Poli, 1795: synonym of Striarca lactea  (C. Linnaeus, 1758)
 Striarca oyamai Habe, 1953: synonym of Striarca symmetrica (Reeve, 1844)
 Striarca pennantiana W.E. Leach in J.E. Gray, 1852: synonym of Striarca lactea  (C. Linnaeus, 1758)
 Striarca perforans W. Turton, 1819: synonym of Striarca lactea  (C. Linnaeus, 1758)
 † Striarca perryi Le Renard, 1994: synonym of  † Arcopsis perryi (Le Renard, 1994) (superseded combination)
 Striarca quoyi B.C.M. Payraudeau, 1826: synonym of Striarca lactea  (C. Linnaeus, 1758)
 Striarca repenta T. Iredale, 1939: synonym of Didimacar tenebrica  (L.A. Reeve, 1844)
 Striarca rosea G.D. Nardo, 1847: synonym of Striarca lactea  (C. Linnaeus, 1758)
  † Striarca songliaoensis Z.-W. Gu & J.-S. Yu, 1976: synonym of  † Ensidens songliaoensis (Z.-W. Gu & J.-S. Yu, 1976) (superseded combination)
 Striarca soyoae Habe, 1958: synonym of Calloarca soyoae (Habe, 1958)
 Striarca striata L.A. Reeve, 1844: synonym of Striarca lactea  (C. Linnaeus, 1758)
 Striarca striatella P. Nyst, 1848: synonym of Striarca lactea  (C. Linnaeus, 1758)
 Striarca tenebrica (Reeve, 1844): synonym of Didimacar tenebrica (Reeve, 1844)
 Striarca thielei Schenck & Reinhart, 1938: synonym of Verilarca thielei (Schenck & Reinhart, 1938)

References

 Vaught, K.C.; Tucker Abbott, R.; Boss, K.J. (1989). A classification of the living Mollusca. American Malacologists: Melbourne. ISBN 0-915826-22-4. XII, 195 pp

External links
 
 Conrad, T. A. (1862). Descriptions of new genera, subgenera and species of Tertiary and Recent shells. Proceedings of the Academy of Natural Sciences. 14: 284-291
  Iredale, T. (1939). Mollusca. Part I. Scientific Reports of the Great Barrier Reef Expedition 1928-1929. 5(6): 209-425, pls 1-7
 Gofas, S.; Le Renard, J.; Bouchet, P. (2001). Mollusca. in: Costello, M.J. et al. (eds), European Register of Marine Species: a check-list of the marine species in Europe and a bibliography of guides to their identification. Patrimoines Naturels. 50: 180-213
 Kilburn, R. N. (1983). The Recent Arcidae (Mollusca: Bivalvia) of southern Africa and Mozambique. Annals of the Natal Museum. 25(2): 511-548
 WMSD : family Noetiidae

Noetiidae
Bivalve genera